Fort Frances Water Aerodrome  is located  northeast of Fort Frances, Ontario, Canada. The aerodrome is a private floatplane base operated by Rusty Myers Flying Service. It shares its airspace and waterway with neighbouring International Falls Seaplane Base  in the United States.

The airport is classified as an airport of entry by Nav Canada and has a direct line available CBSA staff located 2 miles west of Rusty Myers.

See also

Fort Frances Municipal Airport
Falls International Airport - located south of International Falls, Minnesota

References

Registered aerodromes in Rainy River District
Transport in Fort Frances
Seaplane bases in Ontario
Binational airports